Jaques is an unincorporated community in Brown County, Illinois, United States. Jaques is south of Mount Sterling and is near Illinois Route 107.

References

Unincorporated communities in Brown County, Illinois
Unincorporated communities in Illinois